Isaac Mogase (25 January 1934 – 27 April 2021) was the first post-apartheid mayor of Johannesburg.

An anti-apartheid activist, he joined the ANC Youth League in the 1950s and was one of the leaders of the Soweto Crisis Committee in the 1980s. He was jailed numerous times for his political activities.

Mogase later served as a member of the National Assembly of South Africa from 2004 till 2012.

See also
 Timeline of Johannesburg, 2000s

References 

African National Congress politicians
Mayors of Johannesburg
2021 deaths
1934 births
Deaths from the COVID-19 pandemic in South Africa